The nen's double trap shooting event at the 2011 Pan American Games was on October 18 at the Jalisco Hunting Club in Guadalajara. The defending Pan American Games champion is Joshua Richmond of the United States.

The event consisted of two rounds: a qualifier and a final. In the qualifier, each shooter fired 3 sets of 50 shots in trap shooting. Shots were paired, with two targets being launched at a time.

The top 6 shooters in the qualifying round moved on to the final round. There, they fired one additional round of 50. The total score from all 200 shots was used to determine final ranking. Ties are broken using a shoot-off; additional shots are fired one pair at a time until there is no longer a tie.

Schedule
All times are Central Standard Time (UTC-6).

Records
The existing world and Pan American Games records were as follows.

Results
17 athletes from 11 countries competed.

Qualification

Final

References

Shooting at the 2011 Pan American Games